R Trianguli Australis is a yellow-white hued variable star in the southern constellation Triangulum Australe. It is near the limit of visibility to the naked eye, having a typical apparent visual magnitude of 6.73. R TrA is moving closer with a heliocentric radial velocity of −13 km/s.

This is a Classical Cepheid variable with an apparent magnitude that ranges from 6.33 to 6.90 over 3.38926 days. It is a bright giant/supergiant with a nominal stellar classification of F7 Ib/II, but pulsates between spectral types F5Ib/II-G5. Depending on the method employed, the estimated mass is 5.42 or 5.66 times the mass of the Sun and it has 24.7 or 35.8 times the Sun's radius.

References

F-type bright giants
Classical Cepheid variables
Triangulum Australe
Durchmusterung objects
135592
075018
Trianguli Australis, R